The Trenches is a Canadian animated short film, written, directed and animated by Claude Cloutier for the National Film Board of Canada. The film is a portrait of soldiers fighting in the trenches during World War I.

The film premiered in June 2010 at Animafest Zagreb, and had its Canadian premiere at the 2010 Toronto International Film Festival.

The film was a Genie Award nominee for Best Animated Short Film at the 31st Genie Awards in 2011.

References

External links 
 

2010 films
2010 animated films
2010 short films
Canadian animated short films
National Film Board of Canada animated short films
Films directed by Claude Cloutier
Canadian World War I films
2010s Canadian films